The Other Side is a Chris Hillman album, released in 2005. It contains a countryfied version of The Byrds 1966 single, "Eight Miles High."

Track listing
 "Eight Miles High" (Clark, Crosby, McGuinn) – 4:05
 "True Love" (Hill, Hillman) – 2:23
 "Drifting" (Hill, Hillman) – 3:22
 "The Other Side" (Hill, Hillman) – 3:04
 "Heaven Is My Home" (Hill, Hillman) – 2:23
 "Touch Me" (Hill, Hillman) – 3:55
 "The Wheel" (Hill, Hillman) – 3:14
 "True He's Gone" (Sullivan) – 4:28
 "Heavenly Grace" (Hill, Hillman) – 2:44
 "It Doesn't Matter" (Hill, Hillman, Stills) – 3:01
 "Missing You" (Hillman, Russell, Sellers) – 3:56
 "The Water Is Wide" – (4:33)
 "I Know I Need You" (Hill, Hillman) – 3:10
 "Our Savior's Hands" (Hill, Hillman) – 4:24

A 15th track, "Old Rockin' Chair" was briefly available as a bonus track on the downloadable version of the CD. It hasn't been made available ever since.

Personnel
 Chris Hillman – guitar, mandolin, vocals
 Bill Bryson – bass
 Skip Edwards – accordion
 Larry Park – guitar
 Herb Pedersen – 5-string banjo, banjo, guitar, rhythm guitar, vocal harmony, background vocals
 Sally Van Meter – dobro
 Jennifer Warnes – harmony, vocal harmony, vocals
 Gabe Witcher – fiddle

Production
 Steve Hall – mastering
 Richard Aaron – photography
 Scott MacPherson – engineer, mixing
 Mark Matthews – assistant engineer, session photographer
 Scott McPherson – audio engineer

References

2005 albums